Emily Eden (3 March 1797 – 5 August 1869) was an English poet and novelist who gave witty accounts of English life in the early 19th century. She wrote a celebrated account of her travels in India, and two novels that sold well.  She was also an accomplished amateur artist.

Family ties
Born in Westminster, Eden was the seventh daughter of William Eden, 1st Baron Auckland, and his wife Eleanor Elliot. She was the great-great-great-aunt of Prime Minister Anthony Eden.

In her late thirties, she and her sister Fanny travelled to India, where her brother George Eden, 1st Earl of Auckland was in residence as Governor-General from 1835 to 1842. She wrote accounts of her time in India, later collected in the volume Up The Country: Letters Written to Her Sister from the Upper Provinces of India (1867). While the emphasis of her Indian writings was on travel descriptions, local colour and details of the ceremonial and social functions that she attended, Eden also provided a perceptive record of the major political events that occurred during her brother's term of office. These included the total destruction of a British and Indian army during the retreat from Kabul in 1842; a disaster for which George Eden was held partly responsible.

Fiction
Eden wrote two successful novels: The Semi-Detached House (1859) and The Semi-Attached Couple (1860). The latter was written in 1829, but not published until 1860. Both have a comic touch that critics have compared with that of Jane Austen, who was Emily's favourite author. The first of the two has been described as "an accomplished study in the social contrasts of aristocratic style, bourgeois respectability and crass vulgarity."

Eden's letters were published by Violet Dickinson, a close friend of Virginia Woolf. They contain memorable comments on English public life, most famously her welcome for the new King William IV as "an immense improvement on the last unforgiving animal George IV — this man at least wishes to make everybody happy."

Emily Eden's niece Eleanor Lena Eden also took to writing, mainly children's books under the pseudonym Lena. The structure of her 1867 novel Dumbleton Common, which has "Little Miss Patty" detailing gossip in a hamlet outside London, was inspired by Cranford.

Lord Melbourne
Emily Eden never married and was financially well enough off not to need to write, but did so out of passion. After the death of Lady Caroline Lamb, mutual friends hoped she might marry Lord Melbourne, who had become a close friend, although she claimed to find him "bewildering" and to be shocked by his profanity. Melbourne's biographer Lord David Cecil remarks that it might have been an excellent thing if they had married, but "love is not the child of wisdom, and neither of them wanted to."

Personality
Her letters explored London, the colonies, and the high seas. Prudence Hannay argues that armed with "strong feelings and a forthright outlook on life, acute powers of observation and a gift of beautifully translating into words the sense of the ridiculous", she devoted her life to writing. In a 2013 history of her brother's term as Governor General in India, Emily Eden is described as a "waspish but adoring" sister, whose diary was to become one of the most celebrated travel accounts of the period.

References

Further reading
Marian Fowler. Below the Peacock Fan: First Ladies of the Raj. Viking, 1987. . The first of the four sections is an account of Eden's years in India.
John Pemble, editor. Miss Fane in India. Allan Sutton Publishing, 1985. . Accounts of Emily Eden, her sister and Lord Auckland appear in Miss Fane's letters written to her paternal aunt back in England.
Mary Ann Prior. An Indian Portfolio: the Life and Work of Emily Eden. Quartet Books, 2012. . This comprehensive study of Emily Eden's life emphasizes the paintings she produced in India from 1836 to 1842.

External links

1797 births
1869 deaths
Emily
English letter writers
Women letter writers
English women novelists
English feminist writers
19th-century English women writers
19th-century English novelists
English women non-fiction writers
Daughters of barons